Rough for Theatre II (also known simply as Theatre II) is a short play by Samuel Beckett. "Although this discarded piece of theatre is dated 'circa 1960' in End and Odds, a manuscript from two years earlier exists in Trinity College, Dublin, Library. This situates a first version, written in French [as Fragment de théâtre II] and different from that eventually published in 1976 as between the English plays Krapp's Last Tape and Embers." It is rarely produced.

Synopsis

Two bureaucrats, first Bertrand (A) and then Morvan (B) enter a sixth floor apartment where they find Croker (C) standing centre stage in front of an open window with his back to the audience, clearly on the point of throwing himself out of it. A pair of identical tables, lamps and chairs are there waiting for them, stage left and stage right. The set is therefore symmetrical. The name Croker is an obvious pun on the euphemism, 'to croak' i.e. to die, and a name to which Beckett has shown some attachment.

Morvan brings a briefcase with him containing depositions from witnesses who have known Croker as well as "confidences" from the subject himself all neatly filed by subject matter: "Work, family … finances, art and nature, heart and conscience..." – in short what used to be referred to as 'the human condition'. Prodded by Bertrand, he reads from these dossiers. The two speaking characters are there to carry out a pro bono investigation into "the temperament, character and past life of this potential suicide, who never [moves or] speaks … in an apparent attempt to help him decide whether he should or should not take his own life." This is something they do. A previous subject named "Smith" who had been injured in a shooting accident and ends up trying to gas himself is discussed as is their up-and-coming visit to someone "at Bury St. Edmunds."

"A (Bertrand) is more practical, better organised and more knowledgeable; B is more nervous, hot-tempered and prone to use oaths and four-letter words and, although less sensitive than A, he is capable of graphic turns of phrase … A and B are bound together by mutual needs but … this symbiotic relationship is as subject to irritability and impatience as that of Estragon and Vladimir had been."

Unusually Beckett sets the action in a specific year, 1924; however, Bertrand appears vague at first as to what year it actually is. "A refers to "Our Lady of [Perpetual] Succour whose feast is June 27, the next full moon and the anticipated date of the suicide of C, for whom that succour would be appropriate." He also makes an interesting off-the-cuff remark towards the end of the play: "Ah Morvan, you'd be the death of me if I were sufficiently alive!" We can infer from this, and from the fact that they have advance knowledge of a suicide attempt, that these auditors are really some form of cosmic being.

In the 1940s there were a spate of films dealing with various aspects of heavenly administration: Here Comes Mr. Jordan (1941), Heaven Can Wait (1943), A Matter of Life and Death (1946) and It's a Wonderful Life (1946). Beckett may or may not have seen any of these; at the very least he would have likely read about them. Significantly the opening camera shot of It's a Wonderful Life dissolves slowly upward into the star-filled, dark night sky where two pulsating galaxies of light come into view. Two heavenly angels are conversing together in the film's otherworldly opening. In Rough for Theatre II, Bertrand and Morvan take time out to specifically discuss the starry night sky.

We learn that the apartment they are in is "not [Croker's] home. He normally lives on a barge and was only there ostensibly "to feed the cat." Two things may have pushed him to the edge: his "literary aspirations [have been] incompletely stifled" and he has been unable to send a letter to an "anonymous admiratrix." He also has suffered from a number of physical and psychological complaints: "… sick headaches … eye trouble … irrational fear of vipers … ear trouble … pathological horror of songbirds … throat trouble … need for affection … inner void … congenital timidity … nose trouble … morbid sensitivity to the opinion of others …" His continual attempts to run away from home – indicative of an unhappy childhood – are totally ignored by his auditors.

A and B continue, in an almost comic fashion, with the desk lamps flickering on and off, and with a didactic analysis from B ("Shit! Where's the verb?") of the recounts he carries in his folder. In the silent films and early 'talkies' that inspired Beckett, objects frequently adhere to Flagle's Law displaying an intention and mobility that either saps or shapes human actions. (For example, in The Gold Rush, the way that a rifle barrel swings round wildly in a struggle unerringly follows Chaplin in his frantic attempts to escape it.)

"The lineage of Morvan and Bertrand is very much like the vaudeville background of Vladimir and Estragon … [T]hey indulge in sharp, lively repartee like members of a music hall or cinema screen comic duo … The surface lightness of tone derives partly from the lively banter of this administrative duo. But it also owes a lot to word play and stylistic parody. Witnesses who provide comic depositions concerning the subject C's unhappy life have names carefully chosen for their associations: Mr Peaberry, the market-gardener … Mr Swell, the organist … The depositions themselves parody several styles: legalistic syntax and phraseology, applied incongruously to the withholding of sex; 'literary' English contributed by 'Mrs Darcy-Croker, woman of letters' [and] advertising jargon."

There is a more serious subtext however. In this fragment, the reports of the victim's friends are so reductive that Gerry Dukes, in his programme notes, alleges that the play "also indicts written language as inadequate to the task of codifying human experience in meaningful terms." "Among the flurry of papers and testimony, memories and discussion, no real sense of the man emerges. Instead, there is an irritable reaching for premature conclusion … The inventory of reasons advanced for the suicide remains just that, a stark list devoid of imaginative life … What Morvan and Bertrand fail to perceive is the victim's particular perspective that would transform the commonplace into the unendurable."

The comments of each of the witnesses cited highlight the fact that they are self-absorbed and have no real understanding of what Croker was going through: the organist can think of nothing constructive to say and so offers up some twaddle in an attempt to impress; Croker's estranged wife is oblivious to the effect her "five or six miscarriages" and subsequent embargo on sexual relations might have had on him; Peaberry recalls that Croker remembered only calamity; Moore, the light comedian, used Croker's misery to advance his career, working up his drunken confidences into "a skit", Feckman, who counted himself as a "friend for better or worse," relinquished Croker to Fate's care by slipping a lottery ticket in his pocket thus giving him another go at life, albeit a long shot and his mother, who claims that her son had "an inexhaustible reservoir of sorrow" which "irrevocably dissolved" his joys "as by a corrosive", says, with some satisfaction: "[H]e took after me."

His auditors' discussions, which demonstrate neither insight nor pity, reflect the indifference of these witnesses. Even Bertrand, who at the start was at least willing to review the evidence, loses patience and, bored stiff, starts to adopt the same dismissive tone as Morvan had from the very start.

The play does however still contain "several rather moving allusions to suffering, waste and death that possess a characteristically Beckettian note of ambiguity. The bird which A and B hear singing so beautifully is singing with its mate dead in the same cage. Concerning the beauty of the bird's plumage, A comments, 'And to think all that is organic waste! All that splendour.'"

In the end, the pair condemn Croker to jump. When A goes to the window to inspect Croker, however, he is surprised by something inexplicable that causes him to remove his handkerchief and bring it timidly to the would-be jumper's face. Although critics Ackerley and Gontarski assert that A's discovery is an "enigmatic smile" on Croker's face, Beckett makes no mention of this in the ending, leaving it open to various interpretations such as Croker may be crying (justifying the handkerchief), smiling, was dead prior to A and B's arrival or else died during the process.

Related Texts 

Despite working up the text for publication in the seventies, Rough for Theatre II clearly looks back to Waiting for Godot and Endgame rather than forward to the later plays. Had Beckett actually written the play later it would have borne a greater resemblance to That Time, Eh Joe or Ghost Trio, Morvan and Bertrand's characters being reduced to disembodied voices.

In these three plays, the central characters all smile inexplicably as does Croker, something Morvan notes but glosses over.

The indifference to the plight of another is however the focus of a late play Catastrophe, where a director and his assistant are rehearsing the final preparation of an icon of suffering, the icon in question being a man standing silently on a plinth before them. Krapp and Croker share some similarities: both have failed literary aspirations, failed love lives and suffer ill health. Both are alone and approaching death.

Beckett on Film

In June 2000 Rough for Theatre II was filmed at Ardmore Studios, as part of the Beckett on Film project. Katie Mitchell directed and the film featured performances from Jim Norton as Bertrand, Timothy Spall as Morvan and Hugh B. O'Brien as Croker.

References

1950s plays
Theatre of the Absurd
Plays by Samuel Beckett